Pāvels Seničevs (10 June 1924 – 19 May 1997) was a Soviet sports shooter. He competed at the 1964 Summer Olympics and the 1968 Summer Olympics.

Biography
In October 1962 he was a member of the Soviet team at the 38th World Shooting Championships in Cairo. He was armed with MTs 8 shotgun In the trap event at the 1964 Olympics, he won a silver medal.

In 1966 he finished in first place in Brno. In 1967 he finished in first place in Moscow.

References

1924 births
1997 deaths
Soviet male sport shooters
Latvian male sport shooters
Olympic shooters of the Soviet Union
Shooters at the 1964 Summer Olympics
Shooters at the 1968 Summer Olympics
Olympic silver medalists for the Soviet Union
Olympic medalists in shooting
Medalists at the 1964 Summer Olympics
People from Veliky Novgorod
Sportspeople from Novgorod Oblast